First Contact Day is an informal commemorative day observed annually on April5 to celebrate the Star Trek media franchise, and was created by Ronald D. Moore, screenwriter of the 1996 film Star Trek: First Contact. He chose the day based on his eldest son's birthday. The day, however, is based on the fictional future history of events set to take place on April 5, 2063. This is the day that Vulcans first made their presence known to humans.

Additionally, the release date of the original Star Trek series on September 8, 1966, is also celebrated as Star Trek Day.

Celebrations 
Paramount, the owners of the Star Trek franchise, host a number of celebratory initiatives including virtual events and panels annually on the day. Fans, or Trekkies as they are termed, take to social media and use the hashtag #FirstContactDay, generally causing it to trend each year.

References 

Unofficial observances
Star Trek fandom
April observances
Recurring events established in 1997